Nicagus occultus is a species of stag beetle in the family Lucanidae. It is found in North America.

References

Further reading

 
 

Lucanidae
Articles created by Qbugbot
Beetles described in 2005